Nepal is scheduled to compete in the 2017 Asian Winter Games in Sapporo and Obihiro, Japan from February 19 to 26. The country is scheduled to compete in one sport (two disciplines).

Nepal's team consisted of three athletes (one man and two women).

Alpine skier Saphal-Ram Shrestha was the country's flagbearer during the parade of nations at the opening ceremony.

Competitors
The following table lists the Nepalese delegation per sport and gender.

Alpine skiing

Nepal's alpine skiing delegation consists of two athletes (one man and one woman).

Cross-country skiing

Nepal's cross-country skiing delegation consists of one woman. Manikala Rai competed in two races, finishing in 19th out of 23rd position in the women's 10 kilometre freestyle event.

Distance
Woman

References

Nations at the 2017 Asian Winter Games
Nepal at the Asian Winter Games
2017 in Nepalese sport